Ctiboř is the name of several locations in the Czech Republic:

 Ctiboř (Benešov District), a village in the Central Bohemian Region
 Ctiboř (Tachov District), a village in the Plzeň Region

See also
 Ctibor (name)